Mimbaste is a commune in the Landes department in Nouvelle-Aquitaine in south-western France.

It was the birthplace of Catholic visionary Marie Lataste.

See also
Communes of the Landes department

References 

Communes of Landes (department)